The fourth season of Canta Comigo premiered on Sunday, April 10, 2022, at  (BRT / AMT) on RecordTV.

On June 26, 2022, Anna Maz won the competition with 66.72% of the public vote over Lia Lira (22.95%) and Libna (10.33%).

It was the first season to feature a split season finale due to the record number of finalists (22) and also to have an all-female final three.

Heats
 Key
  – Artist advanced to the finals with an all-100 stand up
  – Artist advanced to the semifinals with the highest score
  – Artist advanced to the sing-off in either 2nd or 3rd place
  – Artist score enough points to place in the Top 3 but was moved out and eliminated
  – Artist didn't score enough points to place in the Top 3 and was directly eliminated
  – Artist was eliminated but received the judges' save and advanced to the wildcard

Heat 1

Sing-off details

Heat 2

Sing-off details

Heat 3

Sing-off details

Heat 4

Sing-off details

Heat 5

Sing-off details

Heat 6

Sing-off details

Heat 7

Sing-off details

Wildcard

Sing-off details

Semifinals

Week 1

Sing-off details

Week 2

Sing-off details

Finals

Sing-off details

Elimination chart
Key

Ratings and reception

Brazilian ratings
All numbers are in points and provided by Kantar Ibope Media.

References

External links
 Canta Comigo 4 on R7.com

2022 Brazilian television seasons
All Together Now (franchise)